The Hyanggyo were government-run provincial schools established separately during the Goryeo Dynasty (918-1392) and Joseon Dynasty (July 1392 - August 1910), but did not meet with widespread success in either dynasty.  They were officially closed near the end of the Joseon Dynasty, in 1894, but many were reopened as public elementary schools in 1900.  

In the Joseon Dynasty, hyanggyo were established in every bu, mok, daedohobu, dohobu, gun, and hyeon (the last corresponding roughly to the size of modern-day cities and counties).  They served primarily the children of the yangban, or ruling elite upper-class.  Education was oriented toward the gwageo, or national civil service examinations.  Although such education was in high demand, the hyanggyo were ultimately unable to compete with the privately run seowon and seodang.

See also

Daegu Hyanggyo
Goheung Hyanggyo
Gyeongju Hyanggyo
Jeonju Hyanggyo
Education in the Joseon Dynasty
Seonggyungwan
Seowon
Ganghwa hyanggyo

References

External links 
Asian Historical Architecture: Cheongdo Hyanggyo, a representative example
Cyber Tour to Cultural Property - Jeonju Hyanggyo

 
Education in the Joseon dynasty
Goryeo